Farlen is an unincorporated community in Madison Township, Daviess County, Indiana.

History
A post office was established at Farlen in 1884, and remained in operation until it was discontinued in 1902. The community was named for a McFarlen who kept a store.

Geography

References

External links

Unincorporated communities in Daviess County, Indiana
Unincorporated communities in Indiana
1884 establishments in Indiana
Populated places established in 1884